Duofel is an acoustic guitar duo from Brazil.  The duo, consisting of Fernando Melo and Luiz Bueno, was founded in 1977 and has released several recordings.  They have collaborated with the tabla player Badal Roy.

The group uses classical guitar, steel-string acoustic guitar, and twelve string guitar.

External links
Duofel official site 
Duofel page

Musical groups established in 1977
Brazilian musical duos
Living people
Year of birth missing (living people)